Santa Maria in Palmis, also known as Chiesa del Domine Quo Vadis, is a small church southeast of Rome. It is located about some 800 m from Porta San Sebastiano, where the Via Ardeatina branches off the Appian Way, on the site where, according to the apocryphal Acts of Peter, Saint Peter met the risen Christ while Petrus was fleeing persecution in Rome. According to the tradition, Peter asked him, "Lord, where are you going?". Christ answered, "I am going to Rome to be crucified again".

History 

There has been a sanctuary on the spot since the ninth century, but the current church is from 1637. The current façade was added in the 17th century.

It has been supposed that the sanctuary might have been even more ancient, perhaps a Christian adaptation of some already existing temple: the church is in fact located just in front of the sacred campus dedicated to Rediculus, the Roman "God of the Return". This campus hosted a sanctuary for the cult of the deity that received devotion by travellers before their departure, especially by those who were going to face long and dangerous journeys to far places like Egypt, Greece or the East. Those travellers who returned also stopped to thank the god for the happy outcome of their journey.

The presence of the Apostle Peter in this area, where he is supposed to have lived, appears to be confirmed in an epigraph in the Catacombs of Saint Sebastian that reads Domus Petri. An epigram by Pope Damasus I (366–384) in honor of Peter and Paul reads: "You that are looking for the names of Peter and Paul, you must know that the saints have lived here."

The two footprints on a marble slab at the center of the church — nowadays a copy of the original, which is kept in the nearby Basilica of San Sebastiano fuori le mura — are popularly held to be a miraculous sign left by Jesus. It is to these footprints that the official name of the church alludes: palmis refers to the soles of Jesus' feet. It is likely that these footprints are actually the draft of an ancient Roman "ex voto", a tribute paid to the gods for the good outcome of a journey.

There was an inscription above the front door on the church's façade which used to say: "Stop your walking, traveller, and enter this sacred temple in which you will find the footprint of our Lord Jesus Christ when He met with St. Peter who escaped from the prison. An alms for the wax and the oil is recommended in order to free some spirits from Purgatory." Pope Gregory XVI found the advertising tone of this inscription so inappropriate that he ordered its removal in 1845.

There is also a modern column with a bust of Henryk Sienkiewicz, the Polish author of the famous historical fiction novel Quo Vadis: A Narrative of the Time of Nero (1886). It is said that Sienkiewicz was inspired to write his novel while sitting in this church.

The church is currently administered by priests of the Congregation of Saint Michael the Archangel.

See also 
 Quo vadis
 Saint Peter's tomb

References

External links 
 
 

17th-century Roman Catholic church buildings in Italy
Roman Catholic churches in Rome
Relics associated with Jesus
Roman Catholic churches completed in 1637
Rome Q. IX Appio-Latino
1637 establishments in Italy